John E. "Buddy" Leake, Jr. (May 25, 1933 – February 18, 2014) was an American quarterback and kicker with the Winnipeg Blue Bombers in the Canadian Football League.

Leake was a star player with the Oklahoma Sooners. He played in Canada with the Blue Bombers for 3 seasons, his best being 1956, when he scored 103 points (10 touchdowns, 30 converts, 4 field goals, 1 single) and won the Dave Dryburgh Memorial Trophy.

After leaving football, Leake raised his 8 children with his wife, Carolyn in Memphis, Tennessee before eventually moving to Oklahoma City, Oklahoma in 1979. On February 18, 2014, Leake died at the age of 80 in Oklahoma City.

References

1933 births
2014 deaths
Players of American football from Memphis, Tennessee
Players of Canadian football from Memphis, Tennessee
Oklahoma Sooners football players
American players of Canadian football
Canadian football quarterbacks
Winnipeg Blue Bombers players